Dane pri Sežani is a settlement just outside Sežana in the Littoral region of Slovenia.

References

External links
Dane pri Sežani on Geopedia

Populated places in the Municipality of Sežana